Tudor Hill is a suburb of Sutton Coldfield, in the county of West Midlands, England.

Sutton Coldfield